Fearless is a series of professional wrestling pay-per-view (PPV) events produced by Dragon Gate USA.

Background
Fearless featured eight professional wrestling matches that involved different wrestlers from pre-existing scripted feuds and storylines. Wrestlers were portrayed as either villains or heroes in the scripted events that built tension and culminated into a wrestling match or series of matches.

At the 2010 event, Dragon Kid received a title shot against BxB Hulk, the inaugural Open the Freedom Gate Champion who won a 14-man tournament for the belt at DGUSA Freedom Fight.

Results

2010

2011

References

External links
DGUSA.tv

Dragon Gate USA shows
2010 in professional wrestling
Professional wrestling in the Chicago metropolitan area
2011 in professional wrestling
Professional wrestling in Massachusetts
Events in Chicago
Events in Massachusetts
2010 in Illinois
2010s in Chicago
2010 in Massachusetts